Phragmataecia cinnamomea is a species of moth of the family Cossidae. It is found in Taiwan and southern China (the Jianxi-Fujian border).

References

Moths described in 1911
Phragmataecia